Poanes massasoit, the mulberry wing, is a skipper butterfly found in North America.

Distribution
It is found on the East Coast of the United States, in a few states south and southwest of the Great Lakes, and in southern Ontario and Quebec.

Wingspan is 22–29 mm.

Host plants
Larvae feed on narrow-leafed sedges (Carex stricta) and possibly C. aquatilis, Poaceae, and Cyperaceae sp.

References

External links
Mulberry Wing, Butterflies and Moths of North America

Poanes
Butterflies of North America
Butterflies described in 1864
Taxa named by Samuel Hubbard Scudder